This is a list of known American football players who have played for the Buffalo All-Americans of the National Football League in 1920 - 1923. It includes players that have played at least one match with the team.



A
Ockie Anderson

B
Carl Beck,
Jack Beckett,
Bill Brace,
Pete Bahan,
Shirley Brick, 
Scotty Bierce

C
Glen Carberry, 
Eddie Casey,
Bunny Corcoran, 
Frank Culver

D
Herb Dieter

E
Bill Edgar

F
Jack Flavin,
Andy Fletcher,
Fritz Foster

G
Moose Gardner,
Buck Gavin, 
Gus Goetz,
Gil Gregory,
Mike Gulian,
Charlie Guy

H
Andy Hillhouse,
Tommy Holleran,
Steamer Horning,
Tommy Hughitt

K
Tex Kelly,
Bill Kibler,
Glenn Knack, 
Waddy Kuehl

L
Jim Laird, 
Barney Lepper, 
Lou Little

M
John Mahoney,
Roy Martineau,
Elmer McCormick,
Heinie Miller,
Frank Morrissey,
Jim Morrow, 
Vince Mulvey

N
Bob Nash

O
John O'Hearn,
Elmer Oliphant

P
Earl Potteiger

R
Bob Rawlings,
Ben Roderick

S
Johnny Scott,
Murray Shelton, 
Pat Smith, 
Gus Sonnenberg,
Butch Spagna,
Frank Spellacy, 
Herb Stein, 
Jack Sullivan

T
Karl Thielscher,
Tiny Thornhill,
Carl Thomas,
Mike Trainor

U
Luke Urban,
Eddie Usher

V
George Voss,
Tillie Voss

W
Bill Ward,
Bodie Weldon,
James B. Wilson,
Mike Wilson
Red Werder,
Lud Wray

Y
Swede Youngstrom

References
Buffalo All-Americans roster

Lists
Buffalo All-Americans players
Buffalo A